Dominic Zhai (born February 12, 1990) is an American actor. He recently starred as the role of Bob in the Chinese blockbuster co-production Lost in the Pacific. He currently resides in Beijing, China.

Early life 
Dominic was born in Madison, Wisconsin. He attended the University of Wisconsin–Madison and studied Theater, Biology, and Chinese. After graduating Phi Beta Kappa at the top of his class, he moved to Los Angeles to pursue a career in acting. Dominic also studied at the London Academy of Music and Dramatic Art as well as Upright Citizen's Brigade.

Career 
In Los Angeles, Dominic studied under acting coach, Aaron Speiser, whom eventually referred him to work as an acting coach and translator for Tang Wei in director Michael Mann's Blackhat. Shortly after, Dominic served as a coach for Zhang Yuqi in the film Lost in the Pacific where he also made his Chinese market theatrical debut as the role of Bob. In 2016, Dominic starred as the leading role of Dan in the $1m US-China co-production of "The Offer" TV series. In 2019, Dominic was recognized as one of Forbes 30 Under 30 in the United States which recognizes 600 business and industry figures, with 30 selected in twenty industries each.

Filmography

References

External links 
 
 
 Dominic Zhai on Weibo

1990 births
Living people
Male actors from Wisconsin
21st-century American male actors
American expatriate male actors
American expatriates in China
American male film actors
American male television actors
University of Wisconsin–Madison College of Letters and Science alumni
Actors from Madison, Wisconsin